The 4th World Festival of Youth and Students featured an athletics competition among its programme of events. The events were contested in Bucharest, Romania in August 1953. Mainly contested among Eastern European athletes, it served as an alternative to the more Western European-oriented 1953 Summer International University Sports Week held in Dortmund the same year.

The event reached new peaks, in particular with men's long-distance battles between multiple Olympic champion Emil Zátopek and future Olympic champion Vladimir Kuts (Zátopek won both contests). Ardalion Ignatyev, Yevgeniy Bulanchik, Anatoliy Yulin, Josef Doležal, Ödön Földessy, Leonid Shcherbakov all went on to claim gold medals at the 1954 European Athletics Championships a year later. The men's hammer throw saw European champion Sverre Strandli take on and defeat the reigning Olympic champion József Csermák.

The women's events contained similarly high profile athletes. Aleksandra Chudina defended three of her four titles from the previous edition and won a different fourth title in the javelin throw (having won the 80 metres hurdles in 1951 instead). Nina Otkalenko won the 800 metres – a feat she would repeat at the 1954 European Championships – and Maria Golubnichaya did the same in the 80 m hurdles. The 1948 Olympic championOlga Gyarmati returned but was again held off the long jump podium by Chudina. Having won the Olympic title since her previous runner-up performance at the tournament, shot putter Galina Zybina went on better and won the world student title. Nina Ponomaryova defended her discus throw title, having also become Olympic champion in the meantime.

Yevgeniy Bulanchik (110 m hurdles), Leonid Shcherbakov (triple jump), Ferenc Klics (discus) and Aleksandra Chudina (high jump) became the first athletes to win three consecutive titles in a discipline at the World Festival of Youth and Students. The Soviet Union and East Germany won most of the women's medals, while the men's events were dominated by Soviet, Czechoslovak and Hungarian athletes.

Medal summary

Men

Women

Medal table

References

Results
World Student Games (UIE). GBR Athletics. Retrieved on 2014-12-09.

World Festival of Youth and Students
1953 in Czechoslovak sport
World Festival of Youth and Students
World Festival of Youth and Students
Sport in Bucharest
1953
1953 in Romanian sport